USS Allen (DD-66) was a  destroyer of the United States Navy launched in 1916. She was the second Navy ship named for Lieutenant William Henry Allen (1784–1813), a naval officer during the War of 1812. She was the longest-serving destroyer on the Naval Vessel Register when she was sold in 1946 and was one of the few ships in the US Navy during World War II which was completed during World War I.

Construction and design
Allen was laid down by Bath Iron Works at their Bath Maine shipyard and was launched on 5 December 1916, sponsored by Miss Dorothea Dix Allen and Miss Harriet Allen Butler, and commissioned on 24 January 1917, Lieutenant Commander Samuel W. Bryant in command. Final delivery from Bath Iron Works was recorded as 22 October 1917, per the official records of the Bath Iron Works Company. (record Number 68). Construction cost was $816,185.43 for hull and machinery.

Displacement was  standard and  full load. A geared cruising turbine was fitted which could drive the port propeller shaft.

The ship was armed with four 4-inch (102 mm) 50-calibre guns, with two 1-pounder (37 mm) pom-pom autocannon providing anti-aircraft protection. Four treble mounts for 21-inch (533 mm) torpedo tubes were fitted. Crew was 136 officers and other ranks during wartime and 103 during peacetime.

By 1930, Allens pom-poms had been replaced by a single 3-inch (76 mm) anti-aircraft gun. Allen was rearmed during World War II for escort operations, with two triple torpedo-tube mounts being removed to accommodate depth charge projectors and six Oerlikon 20 mm cannons.

Service history

World War I

In the five months after commissioning, Allen conducted patrol and escort duty along the eastern seaboard of the US and in the West Indies, continuing these duties following the United States entering World War I on the side of the Allies on 6 April. On the night of 30 April/1 May 1917, Allen was escorting the battleship  when she collided with the destroyer , damaging both ships. On 14 June, the destroyer put to sea from New York in the escort of one of the first convoys to take American troops to Europe. After seeing the convoy safely across the Atlantic, Allen joined other American destroyers at Queenstown, Ireland, and began duty patrolling against U-boats and escorting convoys on the last leg of their voyage to Europe under the command of Commander Henry D. Cooke. Cooke was later awarded with the Navy Cross for his leadership of USS Allen.

That duty included escort missions into both French and British ports. During her service at Queenstown, she reported engagements with German submarines on 10 separate occasions, but postwar checks of German records failed to substantiate even the most plausible of the supposed encounters.

One of the last duties the destroyer performed in European waters came in December 1918 when she helped to escort , with President Woodrow Wilson embarked, into Brest, France, on the 13th. Following that mission, the destroyer returned to Queenstown, whence she departed on the day after Christmas, bound for home. Allen pulled into New York on 7 January 1919.

Inter-War Period
After voyage repairs, the destroyer resumed duty along the East Coast and in the West Indies with the United States Atlantic Fleet. That duty continued until 22 June 1922, at which time she was placed out of commission, in reserve. She was placed back in commission three years later, on 23 June 1925. Allen spent almost three years as a training platform for naval reservists at Washington, D.C. In March 1928, the destroyer returned to the Reserve Fleet and was berthed at Philadelphia. There, she remained for more than 12 years. On 23 August 1940, Allen was recommissioned at Philadelphia.

World War II
Following a brief period of service on the United States East Coast, Allen was reassigned to the Pacific Fleet as a unit of Destroyer Division (DesDiv) 80. By the time Allen returned to commission, the Pacific Fleet had been moved from its base on the United States West Coast to Pearl Harbor in Hawaii as a gesture to "restrain" the Japanese. Therefore, Allen moved to the Hawaiian base, whence she operated until the beginning of hostilities between the United States and Japan.

On the morning of 7 December 1941, Allen was moored in East Loch to the northeast of Ford Island and just southeast of the hospital ship . During the Japanese attack on the harbor that morning, she claimed to have assisted in downing three enemy planes.

Following the attack, Allen began duty escorting ships between islands of the Hawaiian chain and patrolling the area for enemy ships, primarily submarines. A primary training function of Allen during this period was to work up new submarine crews in penetrating ASW defensive positions, with Allen acting as the defender. This task is recorded in several histories of US submarine operations in the Pacific as their first actual action against a ship. She also made periodic round-trip voyages to the United States West Coast. Such duty remained her occupation throughout World War II.

In September 1945, Allen steamed from Hawaii to Philadelphia, where she was placed out of commission on 15 October 1945. Her name was struck from the Navy list on 1 November 1945, and she was sold to the Boston Metals Company, Baltimore, Maryland, on 26 September 1946 for scrapping.

Being in service prior to the US entry into World War I, and serving through World War II, Allen was the longest-serving destroyer on the Naval Register when she was sold.

Awards
World War I Victory Medal with "DESTROYER" clasp
American Defense Service Medal with "FLEET" clasp
Asiatic-Pacific Campaign Medal with one battle star
World War II Victory Medal

References

 U.S. Flush Deck Destroyers in Action by Al Adcock & Don Greer. Squadron Publications

External links
Tin Can Sailors.com USS Allen DD-66

Sampson-class destroyers
World War I destroyers of the United States
World War II destroyers of the United States
Ships present during the attack on Pearl Harbor
Ships built in Bath, Maine
1916 ships